James "Big Daddy" Carson Jr. (February 25, 1940 – October 7, 1999) was an American football coach. He served as the head football coach of Jackson State University in Jackson, Mississippi from 1992 to 1998, compiling a record of 54–25–1. Carson's Jackson State Tigers won a black college football national championship in 1996 and back-to-back Southwestern Athletic Conference (SWAC) titles in 1995 and 1996. They appeared in the NCAA Division I-AA Football Championship playoffs three consecutive years from 1995 to 1997.

A native of Clarksdale, Mississippi, Carson played college football as an offensive guard and nose tackle at Jackson State, garnering All-NAIA honorable mention honors in 1962. His son, Ricardo, played football at the school from 1991 to 1994.

Carson stepped down from his post at Jackson State in May 1999 after undergoing intestinal surgery the previous month. He was succeeded as head coach by Judge Hughes. Carson died on October 7, 1999, at his home in Jackson.

Head coaching record

References

1940 births
1999 deaths
American football defensive tackles
American football offensive guards
Alabama A&M Bulldogs football coaches
Jackson State Tigers football coaches
Jackson State Tigers football players
Rust Bearcats football coaches
South Carolina State Bulldogs football coaches
Sportspeople from Clarksdale, Mississippi
Coaches of American football from Mississippi
Players of American football from Mississippi
African-American coaches of American football
African-American players of American football
20th-century African-American sportspeople